Benicio del Toro is a Puerto Rican actor, director and film producer who has received various awards and nominations, including an Academy Award, a British Academy Film Award, a Golden Globe Award, and two Screen Actors Guild Awards.

He rose to fame with his scene-stealing breakout role as the eccentric, unintelligible crook Fred Fenster in The Usual Suspects (1995), which won him his first Independent Spirit Award for Best Supporting Male. The following year, he won a second consecutive Independent Spirit Award for Basquiat (1996). In 2000, he starred in the Steven Soderbergh-directed crime drama film Traffic as the jaded but morally upright police officer Javier Rodriguez. His performance was met with critical acclaim and earned him the Academy Award, the BAFTA Award, and the Golden Globe Award for Best Supporting Actor, as well as two Screen Actors Guild Awards for Outstanding Performance by a Male Actor in a Leading Role and Outstanding Performance by a Cast in a Motion Picture.
In 2003, he starred in 21 Grams directed by Alejandro González Iñárritu, for which he was nominated for a BAFTA Award for Best Actor in a Leading Role and a second Academy Award for Best Supporting Actor. He collaborated with Soderbergh again in 2008 on Che, a biographical film about Ernesto "Che" Guevara which he also produced, for which he won the Cannes Film Festival Award for Best Actor and the Goya Award for Best Actor. He received a third BAFTA Award nomination for the action-thriller film Sicario (2015).

In 2018, he took part in the Showtime miniseries Escape at Dannemora as real-life murderer Richard Matt, for which he was nominated for the Primetime Emmy Award for Outstanding Lead Actor in a Limited Series or Movie.

Awards and nominations

Notes

References

External links 
  

del Toro, Benicio